Cristian Longobardi (born 18 June 1982) is an Italian footballer who plays for San Marino Calcio.

Longobardi primary played in Italian Lega Pro (ex-Serie C, the third and fourth highest level) Longobardi scored a double figure per season from 2004–05 to 2008–09 season.

Biography

Between Serie C & D
Born in Pomigliano d'Arco, the Province of Naples, Longobardi started his career at Cesena. He then played for non-professional teams Montecchio  and Cervia (Serie D and Eccellenza Emilia-Romagna). In mid-2003 he was signed by Serie C2 team Bellaria Igea Marina but returned to Serie D for Boca San Lazzaro in mid-2004. The team won the Group C champion and promoted, which Longobardi played for the team until the team relegated just a year later.

Lega Pro regular goalscorer
In July 2007 he was signed by San Marino Calcio along with Boca team-mate Alessandro Evangelisti. He scored his career high of 13 league goals and was offered a new 3-year contract. In 2008–09 Italian Seconda Divisione season he scored 15 goals.

In July 2009, he was signed by Prima Divisione team Rimini, finished as losing semi-finalists of promotion playoffs. The team bankrupted in July.

On 27 July he signed a 2-year contract with Prima Divisione team Viareggio. He scored 4 goals in 17 league games (eventually as team third top-scorer, behind Tommaso Marolda (6) and January newcomer Riccardo Bocalon (5) ) He also played 2 games in 2010–11 Coppa Italia Lega Pro.

But on 13 January 2011 in exchange with defender Giovanni Martina of Bassano of the same division (but difference group). He scored 5 goals in 13 appearances, made him became the team joint-top-scorer along with Lorenzo Crocetti. On 5 July Bassano signed him outright and agreed a 2-year contract.

On 14 September 2013 he joined Gubbio. On 31 January 2014 he was signed by Delta Porto Tolle. In August 2015 he was signed by Parma Calcio 1913.

References

External links
 
 
 Football.it Profile 
 
 

1982 births
Living people
Italian footballers
A.C. Bellaria Igea Marina players
A.C. Cesena players
A.S.D. Victor San Marino players
Rimini F.C. 1912 players
A.S. Gubbio 1910 players
Association football forwards